The McKinney Cemetery near Tolley, North Dakota, United States, was founded circa 1886.  It has also been known as the Renville Valley Pioneer Cemetery.  It was listed on the National Register of Historic Places (NRHP) in 1978.  According to its NRHP nomination, the cemetery is the oldest cemetery in Renville County and "is also the only remaining physical manifestation of the former town of McKinney."

References

External links
 
 

1886 establishments in Dakota Territory
Cemeteries on the National Register of Historic Places in North Dakota
National Register of Historic Places in Renville County, North Dakota
Ghost towns in North Dakota